Fear of a Black Republican is an American independent political documentary which examines the lack of minorities and especially African Americans in the Republican Party in the United States. The documentary film had its theatrical premiere in Washington, DC on March 22, 2012 and has screened around the United States at theatres, film festivals, colleges and universities and museums. Produced over six years by the married filmmaking team of Kevin and Tamara Williams, the film takes a non-partisan point-of-view of the American two-party political system and why the Republican Party has so few black and urban supporters.

Many of the film's scenes take place in the Northeast and Southern U.S. and  primarily cover the time period of 2004–2009. Former U.S. Presidents Barack Obama and George W. Bush figure prominently in the film, but are not the focus of the film. Many political and media figures, including Mitt Romney, Cornel West, Mike Huckabee, Michael Steele, Tavis Smiley, John McCain, Ann Coulter, Newt Gingrich, Grover Norquist, Senator Edward W. Brooke, Christine Todd Whitman, Michelle Malkin, Jim Gilmore, Lynn Swann and Tom Delay are interviewed. The film also features interviews with many non-celebrities and regular citizens/voters who are Democratic, Republican and Independent.  While the filmmakers identify themselves as Republicans, the film's non-partisan claim is supported by independent reviews from film critics Kam Williams syndicated columnist and Sean Edwards as well as many other reviewers across the country. The film also follows a black Republican female candidate in Atlanta, Georgia named Catherine Davis during her congressional election run.  
The film includes a historical timeline explaining much of the history of the Republican Party and includes the founding of the GOP in 1854 until the “Party of Lincoln” lost the black vote in the 1960s. It also covers the Ku Klux Klan's co-option by the Democratic Party during Reconstruction through the 1960s and the Kennedy-Nixon-Goldwater-Johnson era.  Archival footage, some rarely seen, is included in the film and comes from sources as varied as the National Archives and ABCNews.

References 

^ Williams, Vanessa (March 21, 2012). "Documentary Fear of a Black Republican dives into gray history of party’s racial politics". The Washington Post. Retrieved March 14, 2015.

Thompson, Gary (June 13, 2012). "‘Fear of a Black Republican' explores GOP's complicated relationship with African-American voters" Philadelphia Daily News. Retrieved May 2, 2015.

Williams, Kam (April 14, 2011)."DVD Review: Fear of A Black Republican" Black News. Retrieved March 15, 2014

External links 
 
 

2011 documentary films
2011 films
American documentary films
Documentary films about American politics
2010s English-language films
2010s American films